Transtillaspis cracens is a species of moth of the family Tortricidae. It is found in Loja Province, Ecuador.

The wingspan is 21 mm. The ground colour of the forewings is pale brownish creamy with brownish suffusions. The hindwings are cream, spotted with brownish grey.

Etymology
The species name refers to the shape of the uncus and is derived from Latin craceus (meaning slim).

References

Moths described in 2005
Transtillaspis
Moths of South America
Taxa named by Józef Razowski